Mead is an alcoholic drink made from honey.

Mead may also refer to:

Places

Canada
Mead, Ontario

United States
Mead, Colorado, town
Mead, Nebraska, village
Mead, Oklahoma, town
Mead, Washington, town
Mead, Wisconsin, town
Lake Mead, artificial lake on the Colorado River created by the Hoover Dam
Mead Township, Merrick County, Nebraska
Mead Township, Belmont County, Ohio
Mead Township, Warren County, Pennsylvania
Mead Wildlife Area, wildlife refuge

Other places
Mead (crater), a crater on Venus

Companies
Abbott Mead Vickers BBDO, a UK-based advertising agency
Dodd, Mead and Company, U.S. publishing company in New York
McKim, Mead, and White, U.S. architecture firm
Mead Johnson, a nutritional company
MeadWestvaco, a paper and packaging manufacturing company formed in 2002 by the merger of Mead and Westvaco

Media
MEAD (film), a 2022 science fiction film

Other uses
Mead (surname)
 Mead, a meadow
Mi'ad, also transliterated "mead", an Arabic term for resurrection

See also

Meade (disambiguation)
Meads (disambiguation)
Meadville (disambiguation)
Mede (disambiguation)